Justin Kehoe (born 14 February 1980) is an Irish professional golfer.

Kehoe, who turned pro in 2004, lives in  Birr, County Offaly. He qualified for the 2007 Open Championship, but missed the cut following the first 36 holes. He plays mainly on the PGA EuroPro Tour but has played on the Challenge Tour on numerous occasions.

Tournament wins
Amateur
2001 South of Ireland Amateur Championship
2002 World University Championship (Taiwan)

Results in major championships

Note: Kehoe only played in The Open Championship.
CUT = missed the half-way cut

Team appearances
Amateur
European Boys' Team Championship (representing Ireland): 1998 (winners)
Jacques Léglise Trophy (representing Great Britain & Ireland): 1998 (winners)
European Youths' Team Championship (representing Ireland): 2000
Palmer Cup (representing Great Britain & Ireland): 2001, 2002
Eisenhower Trophy (representing Ireland): 2002
European Amateur Team Championship (representing Ireland): 2003

External links
Kehoe at Open Golf
World University Championship

References

Irish male golfers
Sportspeople from County Offaly
1980 births
Living people